Eric Idle (born 29 March 1943) is an English actor, comedian, musician and writer. Idle was a member of the British surreal comedy group Monty Python and the parody rock band The Rutles, and is the writer of the music and lyrics for the Broadway musical Spamalot (based on Monty Python and the Holy Grail).

Known for his elaborate wordplay and musical numbers, Idle performed many of the songs featured in Python projects, including "Always Look on the Bright Side of Life" (from Life of Brian), and the "Galaxy Song" (from The Meaning of Life). After Monty Python's Flying Circus, he created the sketch show Rutland Weekend Television (1975-76), hosted Saturday Night Live in the US four times in the first five seasons and guest-starred on The Simpsons. Idle's initially successful solo career faltered in the 1990s with the failures of his 1993 film Splitting Heirs (which he wrote, produced, and starred in) and 1998's An Alan Smithee Film: Burn Hollywood Burn (in which he starred). He revived his career by returning to the source of his worldwide fame, adapting Monty Python material for other media. Following the success of the musical Spamalot (which won the Tony Award for Best Musical), he also wrote Not the Messiah, an oratorio derived from the Life of Brian. He was featured in a one-hour symphony of British music when he performed to a global audience at the London 2012 Olympic Games closing ceremony.

Early life and education
Idle was born in Harton Hospital, in South Shields, then part of County Durham, to which his mother had been evacuated from northwest England. His mother, Norah Barron Sanderson, was a health visitor and his father, Ernest Idle, served in the Royal Air Force during World War II, only to be killed in a road accident while hitchhiking home for Christmas in December 1945. Idle said his mother "disappeared for a while into depression" and consequently he was brought up by his grandmother in Swinton, Lancashire. Idle spent part of his childhood in Wallasey on the Wirral peninsula, and attended St George's Primary School. His mother had difficulty coping with a full-time job and bringing up a child, so when Idle was seven, she enrolled him in the Royal Wolverhampton School as a boarder. At this time, the school was a charitable foundation dedicated to the education and maintenance of children who had lost one or both parents. Idle is quoted as saying: "It was a physically abusive, bullying, harsh environment for a kid to grow up in. I got used to dealing with groups of boys and getting on with life in unpleasant circumstances and being smart and funny and subversive at the expense of authority. Perfect training for Python."

Idle stated that the two things that made his life bearable were listening to Radio Luxembourg under the bedclothes and watching the local football team, Wolverhampton Wanderers. Despite this, he disliked other sports and would sneak out of school every Thursday afternoon to the local cinema. Idle was eventually caught watching the film BUtterfield 8 (rated as suitable for audiences aged 16 years and over under the contemporary film certificates) and stripped of his prefecture, though by that time he was head boy. Idle had already refused to be senior boy in the school cadet force, as he supported the Campaign for Nuclear Disarmament and had participated in the yearly Aldermaston March. Idle maintains that there was little to do at the school, and boredom drove him to study hard and consequently win a place at Cambridge University.

Career

Pre-Python career (1965–1969)
Idle attended Pembroke College, Cambridge, where he studied English. At Pembroke, he was invited to join the prestigious Cambridge University Footlights Club by the president of the Footlights Club, Tim Brooke-Taylor, and Footlights Club member Bill Oddie.

Idle started at Cambridge only a year after future fellow-Pythons Graham Chapman and John Cleese. He became Footlights President in 1965 and was the first to allow women to join the club. Idle starred in the children's television comedy series Do Not Adjust Your Set co-starring his future Python castmates Terry Jones and Michael Palin. Terry Gilliam provided animations for the show. The show's cast included comic actors David Jason and Denise Coffey. Idle also appeared as guest in some episodes of the television series At Last the 1948 Show, which featured Cleese and Chapman in its principal cast.

Monty Python (1969–1983, 2014)

Idle wrote for Python mostly by himself, at his own pace, although he sometimes found it difficult in having to present material to the others and make it seem funny without the back-up support of a partner. The other Pythons usually worked in teams and Cleese admitted that this was slightly unfair – when the Pythons voted on which sketches should appear in a show, "he (Idle) only got one vote". However, he also says that Idle was an independent person and worked best on his own. Idle himself admitted this was sometimes difficult: "You had to convince five others. And they were not the most un-egotistical of writers, either." He occasionally wrote with Cleese.

Idle's work in Python is often characterised by an obsession with language and communication: many of his characters have verbal peculiarities, such as the man who speaks in anagrams, the man who says words in the wrong order, and the butcher who alternates between rudeness and politeness every time he speaks. A number of his sketches involve extended monologues (for example the customer in the "Travel Agency" sketch who won't stop talking about his unpleasant experiences with holidays), and he would frequently spoof the unnatural language and speech patterns of television presenters. Idle is said to be the master of insincere characters, from the David Frost-esque Timmy Williams, to small-time crook Stig O'Tracy, who tries to deny the fact that organised crime master Dinsdale Piranha nailed his head to the floor.

The second-youngest member of the Pythons, Idle was closest in spirit to the teenagers who made up much of Python's fanbase. Python sketches dealing most with contemporary obsessions like pop music, sexual permissiveness and recreational drugs are usually Idle's work, often characterised by double entendre, sexual references, and other "naughty" subject matter – most famously demonstrated in "Nudge Nudge". Idle originally wrote "Nudge, Nudge" for Ronnie Barker, but it was rejected because there was 'no joke in the words'.

A talented guitarist, Idle composed many of the group's most famous musical numbers, most notably "Always Look on the Bright Side of Life", the closing number of Life of Brian, which has grown to become a Python signature tune. He was responsible for the "Galaxy Song" from The Meaning of Life and "Eric the Half-a-Bee", a whimsical tune that first appeared on the Previous Record album.

Post-Python career (1973–present)

After the success of Python in the early 1970s, all six members pursued solo projects. Idle's first solo work was his own BBC Radio One show, Radio Five (pre-dating the real Radio Five station by 18 years). This ran for two seasons from 1973 to 1974 and involved Idle performing sketches and links to records, playing nearly all the multi-tracked parts himself.

On television, Idle created and wrote Rutland Weekend Television (RWT), a sketch show on BBC2 with music by Neil Innes. RWT was 'Britain's smallest television network'. The name was a parody of London Weekend Television, the independent television franchise contractor that provided Londoners with their ITV services at weekends; Rutland had been England's smallest county, but had recently been 'abolished' in an administrative shake-up. To make the joke complete, the programme went out on a weekday. Other regular performers were David Battley, Henry Woolf, Gwen Taylor and Terence Bayler. George Harrison made a guest appearance on one episode.

A legacy of RWT was the creation, with Innes, of The Rutles, an affectionate parody of the Beatles. The band became a popular phenomenon, especially in the U.S. where Idle was appearing on Saturday Night Live – fans would send in Beatles LPs with their sleeves altered to show the Rutles. In 1978, the Rutles' mockumentary film All You Need Is Cash, a collaboration between Python members and Saturday Night Live, was aired on NBC television, written by Idle, with music by Innes. Idle appeared in the film as "Dirk McQuickly" (the Paul McCartney-styled character of the group), as well as the main commentator, while Innes appeared as "Ron Nasty" (the band's stand-in for John Lennon). Actors appearing in the film included Saturday Night Live John Belushi, Bill Murray and Gilda Radner, as well as fellow Python Michael Palin, but also real musicians of the 1960s such as former Beatle George Harrison, as well as Mick Jagger and Paul Simon. Idle wrote and directed the Rutles comeback in 2008 for a live show Rutlemania! to celebrate the 30th anniversary. The performances took place in Los Angeles and New York City with a Beatles tribute band.

In 1986, Idle provided the voice of Wreck-Gar, the leader of the Junkions (a race of robots built out of junk that can only speak in film catchphrases and advertising slogans) in The Transformers: The Movie. In 1987, he took part in the English National Opera production of the Gilbert and Sullivan comic opera The Mikado, in which he appeared in the role of the Lord High Executioner, Ko-Ko. In 1989, he appeared in the U.S. comedy television series Nearly Departed, about a ghost who haunts the family inhabiting his former home; the series lasted for six episodes as a summer replacement series.

Idle received good critical notices appearing in projects written and directed by others – such as Terry Gilliam's The Adventures of Baron Munchausen (1989), alongside Robbie Coltrane in Nuns on the Run (1990) and in Casper (1995). He also played Ratty in Terry Jones' version of The Wind in the Willows (1996). However, his own creative projects – such as the film Splitting Heirs (1993), a comedy he wrote, starred in and executive-produced – were mostly unsuccessful with critics and audiences.

In 1994, Idle appeared as Dr. Nigel Channing, chairman of the Imagination Institute and host of an 'Inventor of the Year' awards show in the three-dimensional film Honey, I Shrunk the Audience!, which was an attraction at the Imagination Pavilion at Walt Disney World's Epcot from 1994 until 2010 and at Disneyland from 1998 until 2010. The film also stars Rick Moranis and other members of the cast of the 1989 feature film Honey, I Shrunk the Kids. In 1999, he reprised the role in the short-lived second incarnation of the Journey into Imagination ride at Epcot, replacing Figment and Dreamfinder as the host. Due to an outcry from Disney fans, the attraction was reworked in 2001, reintroducing Figment into the ride while also retaining Idle's role as Nigel Channing. Idle is also writer and star of the 3-D film Pirates – 4D for Busch Entertainment Corporation.

In 1995, Idle voiced Rincewind the "Wizzard" in a computer adventure game based on Terry Pratchett's Discworld novels. In 1996, he reprised his role as Rincewind for the game's sequel, and composed and sang its theme song, "That's Death". In 1998, Idle appeared in the lead role in the poorly received film Burn Hollywood Burn. That same year, he also provided the voice of Devon, One of the two heads of a Two-headed dragon with Don Rickles as the other head Cornwall, in the Warner Bros. animated film Quest for Camelot and as Slyly, the albino Arctic fox in Rudolph the Red-Nosed Reindeer: The Movie.

In recent years, Idle has provided voice work for animation, such as in South Park: Bigger, Longer & Uncut, in which he voiced Dr. Vosknocker. He has made four appearances on The Simpsons as documentarian Declan Desmond. Idle provided the voice of Merlin the magician in the DreamWorks animated film Shrek the Third (2007) with his former Python co-star John Cleese, who voiced King Harold. He has also narrated the audiobook version of Charlie and the Chocolate Factory by Roald Dahl.

In late 2003, Idle began a performing tour of several American and Canadian cities entitled The Greedy Bastard Tour. The stage performances consisted largely of music from Monty Python episodes and films, along with some original post-Python material. In 2005, Idle released The Greedy Bastard Diary, a book detailing the things the cast and crew encountered during the three-month tour.

In 2004, Idle created Spamalot, a musical comedy based on the 1975 film Monty Python and the Holy Grail. The medieval production tells the story of King Arthur and his Knights of the Round Table as they journey on their quest for the Holy Grail. Spamalot features a book and lyrics by Idle, music by Idle and John Du Prez, direction by Mike Nichols, and choreography by Casey Nicholaw.

Idle's play What About Dick? was given a staged reading at two public performances in Hollywood on 10–11 November 2007. The cast included Idle, Billy Connolly, Tim Curry, Eddie Izzard, Jane Leeves, Emily Mortimer, Jim Piddock and Tracey Ullman. The play returned on 26–29 April 2012 in the Orpheum Theatre with most of the cast returning with the exception of Emily Mortimer who was replaced by Sophie Winkleman. Russell Brand also joined the cast. The play was made available for digital download on 13 November 2012.

Idle performed at the 2012 Summer Olympics closing ceremony at the Olympic Stadium in London on 12 August, singing "Always Look on the Bright Side of Life". He was the creator and director of the live show Monty Python Live (mostly) – One down, Five to go which took place at the O2 Arena, London between 1 and 20 July 2014.

In December 2016, Idle was the writer and co-presenter of The Entire Universe, a "comedy and musical extravaganza with the help of Warwick Davis, Noel Fielding, Hannah Waddingham and Robin Ince, alongside a chorus of singers and dancers," broadcast by BBC Two.

In 2020, it was announced that Idle will adapt his script for Spamalot into a feature film for Paramount Pictures, with Nicholaw directing and Dan Jinks producing.

In 2022, Idle competed in season eight of The Masked Singer as "Hedgehog". He did a cover of The Beatles' "Love Me Do" with help from the USC Trojan Marching Band. When eliminated in the first episode alongside William Shatner as "Knight" and Chris Kirkpatrick as "Hummingbird", Idle mentioned to Nick Cannon that he had to get approval from Paul McCartney to do "Love Me Do" for a competition in exchange that McCartney knows what the competition in question is so that he can avoid it. In addition, Idle did an unmasked performance of "Always Look on the Bright Side of Life" from Life of Brian.

Other credits

Writing
Idle has written several books, both fiction and non-fiction. His novels are Hello Sailor and The Road to Mars. In 1976, he produced a spin-off book to Rutland Weekend Television, titled The Rutland Dirty Weekend Book. In 1982, he wrote a West End farce Pass the Butler, starring Willie Rushton. During his Greedy Bastard Tour of 2003, he wrote the diaries that would be made into The Greedy Bastard Diary: A Comic Tour of America, published in February 2005.

Idle also wrote the book and co-wrote the music and lyrics for the musical Monty Python's Spamalot, based on the film Monty Python and the Holy Grail. It premiered in Chicago before moving to Broadway, where it received the Tony Award for Best Musical of the 2004–05 season. Idle won the Drama Desk Award for Outstanding Lyrics.

In a 2005 poll to find "The Comedians' Comedian" (UK), he was voted 21 in the top 50 greatest comedy acts ever by fellow comedians and comedy insiders.

Songwriting
Idle is a songwriter with about 150 songs to his credit. He composed and performed many of Pythons' most famous comic pieces, including "Eric the Half-a-Bee", "The Philosophers' Song", "Galaxy Song", "Penis Song" and, probably his most recognised hit, "Always Look on the Bright Side of Life", which was written for the closing scene of the Monty Python film Life of Brian, and sung from the crosses during the mass crucifixion. The song has since been covered by Harry Nilsson, Bruce Cockburn, Art Garfunkel and Green Day. Idle, his fellow Pythons, and assorted family and friends performed the song at Graham Chapman's memorial service. Idle performed the song at the closing ceremony of the London 2012 Olympic Games on 12 August 2012 and as the farewell song of the last show of the Python's reunion at the O2 arena, 20 July 2014.

As Ko-Ko in the 1987 English National Opera production of The Mikado, Idle wrote his own 'Little List' on "As some day it may happen". In 1989, Idle co-wrote and sang the theme tune to the popular British sitcom One Foot in the Grave and although the series became immensely popular, the song did poorly in the charts. However, when "Always Look on the Bright Side of Life" was adopted as a football chant in the late 1980s, Idle's then neighbour Gary Lineker suggested Idle re-record and release the popular track. With help from Radio 1 breakfast show host Simon Mayo, who gave the song regular airplay and also used the chorus within a jingle, it became a hit, some 12 years after the song's original appearance in Life of Brian, reaching number 3 in the UK charts and landing Idle a set on Top of the Pops in October 1991. The following month Idle, accompanied by opera singer Ann Howard, sang the song at the Royal Variety Performance. He recorded a special version for Mayo's own use on air ("Come on Simon, get another song on now; why don't you put on a nice Cliff Richard record?") and changed the line "life's a piece of shit" to "life's a piece of spit" in order to get daytime airplay on radio. Idle presented Mayo with a model human foot, akin to the one used in the Monty Python title sequence, as a thank you gift for promoting the song.

In 2004, Idle recorded a protest song of sorts, the "FCC Song", in which he lambasts the U.S. FCC for fining him $5,000 for saying "fuck" on national radio. The song contains 14 uses of the word.

In the same year, the musical comedy Spamalot debuted in Chicago and opened in New York's Shubert Theatre on 14 February 2005. Idle wrote the lyrics and book for Spamalot, collaborating with John Du Prez on much of the music. The original 2005 Broadway theatre production was nominated for 14 Tony Awards and won three: Best Musical, Best Performance by a Featured Actress in a Musical (Sara Ramirez), and Best Direction of a Musical (Mike Nichols). In 2006 he wrote, produced and performed the song "Really Nice Day" for the movie The Wild.

In June 2007, "Not the Messiah", a comic oratorio by Idle and John Du Prez premiered at the inaugural Luminato arts festival in Toronto. Idle performed live during this 50-minute oratorio, along with the Toronto Symphony Orchestra and members of the Toronto Mendelssohn Choir. The composer, John Du Prez, was also present. Shannon Mercer, Jean Stilwell, Christopher Sieber, and Theodore Baerg sang the principal parts. The American premiere was at Caramoor (Westchester County, New York) on 1 July 2007. Soloists were the same as in the Toronto performance, but the accompanying chorus was made up of members of New York City's Collegiate Chorale. The show was revised and expanded for a tour of Australia and New Zealand in 2007, including two sell-out nights at the Sydney Opera House. A tour during the summer of 2008 included performances with the National Symphony Orchestra at Wolf Trap National Park for the Performing Arts, the Los Angeles Philharmonic at the Hollywood Bowl in Los Angeles, and the Delaware Symphony Orchestra at the Mann Center for the Performing Arts in Philadelphia.

Idle contributed a cover of Buddy Holly's "Raining in My Heart" for the tribute album Listen to Me: Buddy Holly, released 6 September 2011. He also wrote and sang a variant of the galaxy song for Professor Brian Cox's show Wonders of Life, as well as the new theme for Cox's radio show The Infinite Monkey Cage.

Personal life
Idle has been married twice. His first marriage was in 1969 to actress Lyn Ashley, with whom he had one son, Carey (b. 1973), before their divorce in 1975. He met Tania Kosevich, a former model, in 1977 and they married in 1981. They have one daughter born 1990, and reside in Studio City, Los Angeles.

He is a first cousin of Canadian conductor Peter Oundjian and Nigel Wray, former Chairman of Saracens Rugby Club. David Bowie made Idle godfather to his son, film director Duncan Jones.

Idle holds atheist views, but does not like using the term (he is quoted as saying “I don’t like that word, it implies that there’s a God not to believe in”).

In 2019, Idle was diagnosed with pancreatic cancer. He was diagnosed early and underwent successful surgery to remove the tumour, needing no further treatment after this procedure.

Tributes
An asteroid, 9620 Ericidle, is named in his honour.
 The default Integrated development environment (IDE) of the programming language Python, is called IDLE. Although officially IDLE stands for "Integrated DeveLopment Environment", the name has been chosen in allusion to Eric Idle, as the name of the programming language Python itself has been chosen in allusion to Monty Python.
 The eric IDE for the programming language Python is named in allusion to the aforementioned IDLE IDE and Eric Idle.

Filmography

Film

Television

Video games

Stage

Bibliography
Hello Sailor, novel, 1975, Weidenfeld & Nicolson, 
The Rutland Dirty Weekend Book, 1976, Mandarin 
Pass the Butler, play script, 1982, 
The Quite Remarkable Adventures of the Owl and the Pussycat, children's book, 1996, Dove Books, 
The Road to Mars, novel, 1998, Boxtree, (hardcover),  (paperback)
Eric Idle Exploits Monty Python Souvenir Program, Green Street Press (U.S.), 2000
The Greedy Bastard Tour Souvenir Program, Green Street Press (U.S.), 2003
The Greedy Bastard Diary: A Comic Tour of America, journal, 2005, 
The Writer's Cut, e-Book, 2015, 
Always Look on the Bright Side of Life: A Sortabiography, memoir, 2018,

References

External links

Eric Idle's profile on Monty Python's official website

Eric Idle singing his "FCC Song" in MP3 format from Archive.org
 – the 1965 Cambridge Footlights Club revue during the time when Eric Idle was President of the Footlights, as well as being a member of the revue cast

1943 births
Living people
Actors from County Durham
Alumni of Pembroke College, Cambridge
Audiobook narrators
British expatriate male actors in the United States
British male comedy actors
British male television writers
British novelty song performers
British surrealist artists
Drama Desk Award winners
English agnostics
English atheists
English comedy musicians
English comedy writers
English dramatists and playwrights
English expatriates in the United States
English male comedians
English male composers
English male dramatists and playwrights
English male film actors
English male novelists
English male radio actors
English male singer-songwriters
English male television actors
English male voice actors
English musical theatre composers
English television writers
Grammy Award winners
Monty Python members
Musicians from Tyne and Wear
People educated at the Royal Wolverhampton School
People from South Shields
People from Wolverhampton
The Rutles members
20th-century English comedians
21st-century English comedians
20th-century English composers
21st-century English composers
20th-century English male actors
21st-century English male actors
20th-century English novelists
21st-century English novelists
20th-century English singers
21st-century English singers